Mohamed el-Qasabgi (pronounced in local Egyptian dialect as Mohamed el-Asabgi; 1892 – 25 March 1966) was an Egyptian musician and composer, and is regarded as one of the five leading composers of Egypt in the 20th century. Most of his credits went to Umm Kulthum, Asmahan, and Layla Murad who sang most of his great works and scores.  Until today, most critics classify Mohamed El Qasabgi as the master of the oud due to his great abilities and skills which he had during his time.

In most of his tunes, there is a real sensation of the pure Oriental spirit, mixed with European musical techniques and taste.  This was mostly seen in songs like Ya Toyour, Raa' El Habeeb, Ana Albi Daleeli.

In the above mentioned songs and many others, he was widely recognized by most musicians and critics at that time as the leader of development of Oriental music, and mixing it with newest musical techniques and influences brought in from Western classical traditions of his time.

Important dates
 1892 Birth of El Qasabgi.
 1917 Actual journey begins.
 1920 Mohamed El Qasabgi composes songs for great singers of that time, including the legendary Mounira El Mahdeya.
 1920 through 1923 The legendary Mohammed Abdel Wahab learns the lute at the hands of Qasabgi.
 1924 Umm Kulthum sings his music for the first time.  In the same year, he forms his own Oriental musical band which included great musicians.
 1927 Mohamed El Qasabgi composes the monolog In Kuntu Asamih  performed by Umm Kulthum. This song creates a revolution in the taste of Oriental music.
 1933 Asmahan sings his music for the first time.
 1930s Mohamed El Qasabgi is Umm Kulthum's favorite composer.
 1941 He composes for Umm Kulthum what most critics recognise as his all time great piece under the name of Raa' El Habeeb.
 1942 He composes the first real Egyptian opera, and is assisted by Riyadh El Sonbati, another great legend.
 1948 He composes the last song for Umm Kulthum, after which he nearly quits composing until the year of his death, yet stays a leading figure in the music band of all Umm Kulthum's nights and songs until his death in 1966.
 1960 Wins the Science and Art Distinction by then Egyptian president Gamal Abdel Nasser

Notable works 
Actually the following works which were composed by Mohamed El Qasabgi are considered to be essential classics, and must have musical masterpieces where he kept the sense of pure Oriental music with the newest foreign Western musical techniques.  With these songs and many others, he is recognized by most of his fellow musicians, including Umm Kulthum, Zakariyya Ahmad, and Mohammed Abdel Wahab, as being the master of the new music spirit. And below is a list of some of his famous works

 In Kuntu Asamih 1927
 Enti Fakrani 1931
 Leih Telawe'eni 1932
 Ayyuhal Fulk (Oh Ship...) 1934
 Fein El Oyoun 1934
 Songs of 'Widad' movie 1935
 Songs of 'Nasheed El Amal' movie 1937
 Madam Teheb 1940
 Asqiniha 1940
 Ya Tuyoor 1941
 Raa' El Habeeb 1941
 Opera Aida - Composed by Mohamed El Qasabji and Riyadh El Sonbati 1942
 Hal Tayyam Al Ban 1942
 Emta Ha Te'raf 1944
 Ana Elli Astahel 1944
 Ana Albi Daleeli 1948

References

External links
 http://www.athaqafia.com
 https://web.archive.org/web/20070113090051/http://www.yabeyrouth.com/pages/index869.htm
 https://web.archive.org/web/20051202072618/http://arab-music.tripod.com/id15.html
 https://web.archive.org/web/20090415072425/http://www.sis.gov.eg/Ar/Arts&Culture/musicsinging/famoussingers/070602000000000009.htm
 https://archive.aawsat.com/details.asp?section=25&issueno=10293&article=404477

1892 births
1966 deaths
Egyptian composers
Egyptian oud players
20th-century composers